Michael Joseph Sobran Jr. (February 23, 1946 – September 30, 2010) was a paleoconservative American journalist. He wrote for the National Review magazine and was a syndicated columnist. During the 1970s, he frequently used the byline M. J. Sobran.

In his columns, Sobran was moralistic, opposed to big government, and an isolationist critic of U.S. foreign policy. When he fired Sobran from his longtime job at National Review in 1993, publisher William F. Buckley termed some of Sobran's writings "contextually anti-Semitic". In the early 2000s, Sobran was a speaker for a Holocaust denial group.

Biography

Early life 
Sobran was born in Ypsilanti, Michigan, into a Roman Catholic family. He graduated in 1969 from Eastern Michigan University in Ypsilanti with a Bachelor of Arts in English. He studied for a Master of English degree with a concentration on Shakespearean studies. In the late 1960s, Sobran lectured on Shakespeare and English on a fellowship with Eastern Michigan.

Columnist 
In 1972, while at Eastern Michigan, Sobran published rebuttals of criticisms from other faculty of an upcoming campus visit by William F. Buckley Jr., publisher of the National Review and a prominent conservative. After reading Sobran's comments, Buckley hired him as a columnist at the National Review. After three years, Buckley promoted Sobran to senior editor. They had a long friendship. 

Aside from his work at National Review, Sobran spent 21 years as a commentator on the CBS Radio Spectrum program series. He was a syndicated columnist, first with the Los Angeles Times and later with the Universal Press Syndicate.  From 1988 to 2007, he wrote the column "Washington Watch" for the traditionalist lay Catholic weekly The Wanderer. He also wrote a monthly column for the traditionalist Catholic Family News (a publication considered anti-Semitic by the Southern Poverty Law Center) and the "Bare Bodkin" column for Chronicles magazine. He was a media fellow of the Mises Institute.

Firing from National Review 
In 1993, in a column in The Wanderer, Sobran attacked Buckley for his support of the 1991 Gulf War. Already unhappy with Sobran's columns on Israel and anti-Semitism, Buckley was reportedly angered that Sobran had used information from their private conversations and decided to fire him as senior editor. Buckley said he considered some of Sobran's columns to be "... contextually anti-Semitic. By this I mean that if he had been talking, let us say, about the lobbying interests of the Arabs or of the Chinese, he would not have raised eyebrows as an anti-Arab or an anti-Chinese". In response to his firing, Sobran claimed that Buckley told him to "stop antagonizing the Zionist crowd" and accused him of libel and moral incapacitation. In his own assessment, Columnist Norman Podhoretz wrote that Sobran's columns were "anti-Semitic in themselves, and not merely 'contextually. 

In 1994, he founded "Sobran’s: The Real News of the Month", a newsletter that published until 2007. Sobran was named the Constitution Party's vice presidential nominee in 2000, but withdrew later that year due to scheduling conflicts.

Institute for Historical Review 
In 2001, Pat Buchanan offered Sobran a column in Buchanan's new magazine The American Conservative. (After Sobran's death, Buchanan called him "perhaps the finest columnist of our generation".) However, the magazine's editor, Scott McConnell, withdrew the offer when Sobran refused to cancel his appearance before the Institute for Historical Review, a leading Holocaust-denying group.  

In 2001 and 2003, Sobran spoke at conferences organized by David Irving and shared the podium with Paul Fromm, Charles D. Provan, and Mark Weber, director of the Institute for Historical Review. In 2002, he spoke at the Institute for Historical Review's annual conference. Referring to Sobran's appearance at the conferences, historian Deborah Lipstadt wrote: "Mr. Sobran may not have been an unequivocal [Holocaust] denier, but he gave support and comfort to the worst of them".  Writing in National Review, Matthew Scully said: "His appearance before that sorry outfit a few years ago [...] remains impossible to explain, at least if you're trying to absolve him".

In the 2008 presidential election, Sobran endorsed Constitution Party candidate Chuck Baldwin.

Death and legacy 
Sobran was twice married and divorced. He had four children. Sobran died in a nursing home in Fairfax, Virginia, on September 30, 2010, of kidney failure due to diabetes.

Views

Philosophy 
Throughout much of his career, Sobran identified as a paleoconservative like his colleagues Samuel T. Francis, Pat Buchanan, and Peter Gemma. He claimed to support a strict interpretation of the United States Constitution. He asserted that the Tenth Amendment meant that almost every federal government act since the Civil War had been illegal. In 2002, Sobran announced his philosophical and political shift to libertarianism (paleolibertarian anarcho-capitalism), citing inspiration by theorists Murray Rothbard and Hans-Hermann Hoppe. He referred to himself as a "theo-anarchist".

Sobran asserted in the neo-Confederate Southern Partisan magazine that Martin Luther King Jr.'s dream had become an "American nightmare" because civil rights had encouraged, in Sobran's words, "black thugs".

Catholic teachings 
Sobran said Catholic teachings were consistent with his opposition to abortion and the Iraq War. Asked to summarize his views, Sobran said once, "I won't be satisfied until the Church resumes burning for heresy" — a remark that Buchanan's biographer Timothy Stanley described as "funny, offensive and honest".

Jews and Israel 
Sobran frequently used his columns to criticize Israel, the Holocaust and Zionism. In one column, Sobran wrote that The New York Times "really ought to change its name to Holocaust Update". In a 1992 column, he complained of "a more or less official national obsession with a tiny, faraway socialist ethnocracy", meaning Israel. Sobran argued that the 9/11 attacks were a result of the United States government's policies in the Middle East. He claimed those policies are formed by the "Jewish lobby".

In 2002, Sobran wrote, "My chief offense, it appears, has been to insist that the state of Israel has been a costly and treacherous ‘ally’ to the United States. As of last Sept. 11, I should think that is undeniable. But I have yet to receive a single apology for having been correct." Sobran said he lacked the "scholarly competence" to be a Holocaust denier. He also claimed that the official number of Holocaust victims was inaccurate and that Nazi Germany was not intent on racial extermination. He said his attitude was not anti-Semitism but "more like counter-Semitism".

Published works

Books 
 Single Issues: Essays on the Crucial Social Questions – Human Life Press – 1983
 Alias Shakespeare: Solving the Greatest Literary Mystery of All Time – Free Press 1997.  Sobran espoused the Oxfordian theory that Edward de Vere, 17th Earl of Oxford, wrote the plays attributed William Shakespeare .
 Hustler: The Clinton Legacy – Griffin Communications 2000
At the time of his death, Sobran was working on two books, one concerning Abraham Lincoln's presidency and the United States Constitution and another about de Vere's poetry.

Articles and speeches 
His essays appeared in The Human Life Review, Celebrate Life! and The Free Market.
 The Church Today: Less Catholic Than the Pope? – National Committee of Catholic Laymen – 1979
 How Tyranny Came to America, Sobran's, n.d.
 Pensees: Notes for the reactionary of tomorrow, National Review, December 31, 1985. (extended essay)
 Power and Betrayal – Griffin Communications – 1998
 Anything Called a Program is Unconstitutional – Griffin Communications – 2001

References

External links
 
 How Tyranny Came to America
 Pensees: Notes for the reactionary of tomorrow

1946 births
2010 deaths
20th-century American journalists
20th-century American male writers
20th-century American non-fiction writers
20th-century Roman Catholics
21st-century American journalists
21st-century American male writers
21st-century American non-fiction writers
21st-century Roman Catholics
American anarcho-capitalists
American anti-abortion activists
American columnists
American conspiracy theorists
American Holocaust deniers
American libertarians
American male journalists
American political journalists
American political writers
American traditionalist Catholics
Anti-Masonry
Catholics from Michigan
Catholics from Virginia
Constitution Party (United States) vice presidential nominees
Deaths from diabetes
Eastern Michigan University alumni
English male dramatists and playwrights
Far-right politics in the United States
Journalists from Michigan
Mises Institute people
National Review people
Non-interventionism
Oxfordian theory of Shakespeare authorship
Paleoconservatism
Paleolibertarianism
People from Fairfax, Virginia
People from Ypsilanti, Michigan
Shakespeare authorship theorists
Traditionalist Catholic conspiracy theorists
Traditionalist Catholic writers
Virginia Constitutionalists
Writers from Michigan
Writers from Virginia